Spastic paraplegia 16 (complicated, X-linked recessive) is a protein that in humans is encoded by the SPG16 gene.

References

Further reading